Indre Nordmør (Inner Nordmøre) was a Norwegian local newspaper published for the municipalities of Surnadal, Rindal, and Halsa in the county of Møre og Romsdal. 

The newspaper was founded in 1979 by Lars Steinar Ansnes, who also served as the paper's first editor. The main office was in Skei, in the municipality of Surnadal. It had a circulation of about 2,000. The newspaper was partially owned by Aura Avis in Sunndalsøra. It was issued three days a week until the fall of 1982; it then appeared weekly until it was discontinued in 1991. The newspaper's last editor was Olav Grimsmo. Today Lars Steinar Ansnes is the chief editor of Aura Avis.

References

Defunct newspapers published in Norway
Norwegian-language newspapers
Mass media in Møre og Romsdal
Nordmøre
Newspapers established in 1979
1979 establishments in Norway
Publications disestablished in 1991
1991 disestablishments in Norway